George William Fullerton (March 7, 1923 – July 4, 2009) was a longtime associate of Leo Fender and, along with Fender and Dale Hyatt, a co-founder of G&L Musical Instruments.  He is credited with design contributions that led to the manufacture of the first mass-produced solid-body electric guitar.

Biography

Born in Hindsville, Arkansas, George Fullerton moved to Southern California in 1940. He served in the United States Marine Corps and later worked part-time at Lockheed Aircraft as a machinist while attending night school to further his interest in electronics.

Leo Fender invited Fullerton to join his company and Fullerton became a full-time Fender employee on February 28, 1948.  He is credited with design innovations that allowed Fender to produce its first solid body electric guitars, the Esquire and Broadcaster, which the company introduced in 1950.  After leaving Fender in 1970, he continued to work with Leo Fender at the CLF Research company, and later co-founded G&L Musical Instruments along with Fender and longtime Fender salesman Dale Hyatt.  Fullerton returned to Fender as a consultant in the company's custom shop in 2007. In November 2007, the company unveiled the limited edition George Fullerton 50th anniversary 1957 Stratocaster guitar and Pro Junior amplifier.

Fullerton was inducted into the Fender Hall of Fame in 2010.

See also
 G&L Musical Instruments

References

External links 
 Los Angeles Times obituary
 George Fullerton, Guitar Icon (1923-2009)
 Guitar Player magazine biography
 G&L Musical Instruments
 George Fullerton 50th Anniversary 1957 Stratocaster Guitar and Pro Junior Amp
George Fullerton Interview - NAMM Oral History Library (2003)

1923 births
2009 deaths
People from Fullerton, California
Fullerton. George
Guitar_makers
Fender people
20th-century American musicians